Zafar Iqbal (born 27 September 1933) is an Urdu poet based in Okara, Punjab, Pakistan.

Early life and career
Zafar Iqbal was born in 1933 Bahawalnagar, Punjab where his maternal grandparents lived. Then he received his basic early education in Okara, Punjab which is his hometown and later moved to Lahore for his college education.
His poetry is mainly in the genre of ghazal. The diction of his ghazal is entirely different from traditional Urdu poetry. He is a lawyer by profession, and regularly contributes articles to some Urdu newspapers.

In contrast to classical Poets, Zafar's poetry portrays love as scientific and physical rather than supernatural. Dr Tabassam Kaashmiri called him Literature's renegade of the 20th century. Former Chief Minister of Punjab (Pakistan), Hanif Ramay who was also a writer and a well-known literary critic called him a poet of a new tone and new concepts.

Besides being a poet, he has been a newspaper columnist for different newspapers for over 35 years. Considering that he also has been a professional lawyer for most of his adult life, those are not small accomplishments. He practised as an attorney, first in Okara and then in Lahore until 2003, when he had a heart bypass surgery and quit practicing law.

Zafar Iqbal has a son named Aftab Iqbal who is a newspaper columnist and a well-known TV anchor in Pakistan.

Poetry collections
Tamjid
Taqweem
Tashkeel
Tajawaz
Tawarid
Tasahil
Hay Hanuman
Ab Tak
gul aftaab

Books
Aab-i-Rawan
Gulaftab
Ratb-o-Yabis
Ghubaaralood simtaun ka suragh
Sar-i-aam
Aib-o-hunar
Vehm-o-gumaan

Awards and recognition
Hilal-i-Imtiaz Award (Crescent of Excellence Award) by the President of Pakistan in 2014.
Pride of Performance Award by the President of Pakistan in 1999.

References

External links

1932 births
Pakistani male journalists
Urdu-language poets from Pakistan
Pakistani lawyers
Recipients of the Pride of Performance
Living people